The Cheech Marin Center for Chicano Art, Culture & Industry of the Riverside Art Museum, or The Cheech, is an art museum and academic center in Riverside, California, United States. The center will focus on the presentation and study of chicano art from across the United States. It is a collaborative effort between stand-up comedian, actor, and writer Cheech Marin, who will donate his collection of more than 700 pieces of Chicano art, the City of Riverside, which will provide the facilities to house the collection, and the Riverside Art Museum, which will manage the center. The collection will be housed in the old Riverside public library, and when complete, the center is expected to be a world-class institution to research and study "all things [related to] Chicano art". It will be the first North American facility dedicated to Mexican-American art.

Center location and funding 
After a successful exhibit of some of Marin's collection at the Riverside Art Museum in early 2017, the city and museum approached Marin about establishing a permanent home for his collection in Riverside. The idea of keeping the collection intact appealed to Marin. The city's emphasis on history, art and culture, as well as the large Latino population in the area, and the proximity to five universities, were also appealing.  With two of the universities, the University of California, Riverside, and California State University, San Bernardino, already offering Chicana/o studies programs, Marin was convinced Riverside was the right location.

The center, which Marin has informally dubbed "The Cheech", will be housed in what is currently the main branch of the city of Riverside's library system, a  facility located adjacent to the historic The Mission Inn Hotel & Spa. A new downtown library is currently under construction at another location, and is due to open in the second half of 2020. After the library move is complete, the existing building will undergo a renovation to repurpose the library for the new art museum and academic center.

A fundraising campaign, named "Reach for the Cheech", was started in 2017. After receiving a $600,000 pledge from the Riverside-based Altura Credit Union, the campaign was able to meet its initial fundraising goal of three million dollars on May 29, 2018. Shortly after Altura's commitment, the State of California included in its budget an additional $9.7 million to assist with the development of the center.  In December 2019, the Bank of America made a $750,000 commitment, bringing the total raised to almost $14 million.

Museum collection 
The initial collection of over 700 works, donated by Cheech Marin, will consist of paintings, drawings, prints, mixed media, sculptures and photography that Marin has assembled over the past 30 years.  The collection covers a range of Chicano art types, including rasquachismo, which has been growing in popularity. Marin, who came to fame in the 1970s as part of the comedy duo Cheech & Chong, is noted for having the largest private collection of Chicano art in the world. The Center intends to expand the collection over time.

Over 70 artists are represented in the collection, including:

The Cheech film 
In 2019 Edward Tyndall directed a film featuring Cheech Marin titled The Cheech: An American Icon's Crusade for the Chicano Art Movement. The film covers Marin's lifelong advocacy for Chicano art, and his efforts to develop The Cheech Marin Center for Chicano Art, Culture and Industry. The original music score was written by El Dusty.

See also 

 Archives of American Art
 Chicano
 Chicana art
 :Category:Chicano art

References

External links 
 

Chicano art
Museums in Riverside, California
Art in Greater Los Angeles
Art museums and galleries in California
Arts centers in California
Ethnic museums in California
Latino museums in the United States
Museums established in 2022